Cannabis in Eritrea is illegal with severe penalties for the production, sale, and possession of marijuana for medicinal or recreational purposes. Offenders are imprisoned up to twelve months and fined up to 50'000 Nkf for possession. Conditions for cultivation in Eritrea are poor.

Like other countries in East Africa, Eritrea is used as a drug trafficking hub. Cannabis from Southwest and Southeast Asia is transferred through Djibouti to other countries in Africa, the Middle East, and Europe. This began soon after Eritrea's independence, when young Eritrean nationals, raised in Europe and North America, returned to their country and introduced drugs into the newly developing society.

History 
Cannabis leaves are sometimes used in Eritrean folk medicine.

Under Italian rule, hemp was cultivated in Eritrea.

References

Eritrea
Politics of Eritrea
Health in Eritrea
Society of Eritrea